Hazen may refer to either of two places in the U.S. state of Pennsylvania:

 Hazen, Beaver County, Pennsylvania, an unincorporated community and census-designated place
 Hazen, Jefferson County, Pennsylvania, an unincorporated community